Anne Hastings may refer to:

Anne Hastings, Countess of Pembroke, née Manny (1355–1384)
Anne Hastings, Countess of Shrewsbury, (1471–1520), wife of George Talbot, 4th Earl of Shrewsbury
Anne Hastings, Countess of Huntingdon, née Stafford (1483–1544), mistress of Henry VIII